Grave Robber is an American horror punk band from Fort Wayne, Indiana. The band started rehearsing in 2005. In 2006, Grave Robber released, a vinyl EP, Love Hurts independently. Their first two studio albums, Be Afraid and Inner Sanctum, were released by Retroactive Records, correspondingly in 2008 and 2009. The subsequent three studio albums, Exhumed, You're All Gonna Die!, and Escaping The Grave were released by Rottweiler Records, correspondingly in 2010, 2011, and 2018. An EP, Straight To Hell was released in 2014.  Rottweiler Records has acquired the rights to Be Afraid and Inner Sanctum, with plans to re-release in 2020.

Background
Grave Robber is a punk band of the horror punk variety. They are from Fort Wayne, Indiana, were they formed as a group in October 2005. Their members are vocalist Wretched, bassist Carcass, guitarist Viral, and drummer Plague.

Music history
The band commenced their musical recording careers in 2008, with their first studio album, Be Afraid, that was released on April 29, 2008, with Retroactive Records. While their subsequent studio album, Inner Sanctum, was released by Retroactive Records, on January 1, 2009. They released, Exhumed, a studio album, with Rottweiler Records, on December 4, 2010. Their fourth studio album, You're All Gonna Die!, was released on November 7, 2011, by Rottweiler Records. In October 14, 2014. Straight to Hell, a limited edition 4 song EP was released.  Escaping The Grave, the band's fifth full length release was released April 13, 2018.

Members

Characters

Current members
 Wretched – lead vocals
 Viral – guitar, backing vocals
 Carcass – bass, backing vocals
 Plague – drums

Former members
 Rot – drums
 Dr. Cadaver – drums, bass, backing vocals
 Nameless – guitar
 Maggot – bass
 Lamentor – guitar, backing vocals
 De Muerte – drums, backing vocals
 Grimm – guitar, backing vocals

Members

Current members
 Shawn Browning - vocals
 Andy Whitten - guitar, backing vocals
 Craig Weitz - bass, backing vocals

Former members
 Dan Kinnaley (ex-guitar)
 Lance Davis (ex-bass)
 Morrison Agen (ex-bass)
 Chuck Thomas (ex-drums)
 Mark Mettert (ex-bass/drums)
 Dave Oliver (ex-drums)
 Christian Morris (ex-drums)
 Grant Butler (ex-guitar)
 Zach Hull (ex-drums)
 Mike Walter (ex-guitar)
 Shawn Spano (ex-drums)
 Sam Ochsner (ex-drums)
 Craig Weitz (ex-bass, ex-drums)
 Chris Houk (ex-guitar)
 Gene Feasel (ex-bass)
 Jon Dorris (ex-guitar)
 Justin Ramage (ex-drums)
 Joe Jones (ex-bass)
 Nick Fairchild (ex-drums)

Discography
Studio albums
 Be Afraid (April 29, 2008, Retroactive)
 Inner Sanctum (January 1, 2009, Retroactive)
 Exhumed (December 4, 2010, Rottweiler)
 You're All Gonna Die! (November 7, 2011, Rottweiler)
 Escaping the Grave! (2018, Rottweiler)
 Dry Bones (2019, Rottweiler)
 Scary Christmas To You (2019, Rottweiler)
EPs
 Love Hurts (2006)
 Straight to Hell (EP) (January 21, 2015, Rottweiler)
 Untote Leichen (2019, Sick Taste Records)
Compilation appearances
 The Pack Vol. 1 (2016; Rottweiler)
 Metal From The Dragon (Vol. 2) (2017; The Bearded Dragon Productions)

References

External links
 Facebook page

Christian punk groups
Punk rock groups from Indiana
Horror punk groups
2005 establishments in Indiana
Musical groups established in 2005
Rottweiler Records artists